The Associated Press Women's College Basketball Player of the Year award was established in 1995 to recognize the best women's college basketball player of the year, as voted upon by the Associated Press (AP).

Winners

References

Associated Press awards
Awards established in 1995
College basketball player of the year awards in the United States